Óscar Rodríguez Arnaiz (born 28 June 1998), known as Óscar Rodríguez ir simply Óscar, is a Spanish professional footballer who plays as an attacking midfielder for Celta Vigo, on loan from Sevilla, and the Spain national team.

Club career

Real Madrid

Born in Talavera de la Reina, Toledo, Castile-La Mancha, Óscar joined Real Madrid's La Fábrica in 2009, from CD Los Navalmorales. Ahead of the 2017–18 season, he was promoted to the reserves in Segunda División B.

Óscar made his senior debut on 19 August 2017, starting and being booked in a 1–2 home loss against CF Rayo Majadahonda. He scored his first goal on 11 November, netting the opener in a 2–0 away win against CCD Cerceda.

Óscar made his first-team debut on 28 November 2017, starting in a 2–2 home draw against CF Fuenlabrada, for the season's Copa del Rey. The following 12 July, after being a regular starter in Santiago Solari's Castilla, he renewed his contract until 2023.

Leganés (loan)

On 13 August 2018, Óscar was loaned to La Liga side CD Leganés for the season, being handed the number 27 jersey. He made his debut for the club on 16 September, replacing Diego Rolán in a 0–1 home loss against Villarreal CF.

Óscar scored his first goal in the top tier on 26 September 2018, netting the winner in a 2–1 home win over FC Barcelona. On 31 May 2019, after four goals in 30 league appearances, his loan was extended for a further year.

Óscar ended the 2019–20 campaign as Legas top goalscorer with nine goals, but was unable to avoid team relegation.

Sevilla
In the summer of 2020, he moved to Sevilla for €13.5m.

Loan to Getafe 
On 17 January 2022, Getafe announced the loan signing of Óscar until the end of the 2021–22 season.

Loan to Celta 
On 8 July 2022, Celta announced the loan signing of Óscar for the 2022–23 season.

International career
After representing Spain at under-17, under-19, under-20 and under-21 levels, Óscar received his first senior call-up on 20 August 2020, for two UEFA Nations League fixtures against Germany and Ukraine. He made his senior debut in the former, in a 1-1 away draw.

Career statistics

Club

International

References

External links
Real Madrid profile

1998 births
Living people
People from Talavera de la Reina
Sportspeople from the Province of Toledo
Spanish footballers
Footballers from Castilla–La Mancha
Association football midfielders
La Liga players
Segunda División B players
Real Madrid Castilla footballers
Real Madrid CF players
CD Leganés players
Sevilla FC players
Getafe CF footballers
RC Celta de Vigo players
Spain youth international footballers
Spain under-21 international footballers
Spain international footballers